Reyes del Show is the season three of the 2015 edition of El Gran Show premiered on November 7, 2015.

In this season the lifeguard was not used, reason why one of the couples was definitively eliminated in the duel.

On December 19, 2015, singer Yahaira Plasencia and George Neyra were crowned champions, axé star Brenda Carvalho and Pedro Ibáñez finished second, while María Grazia Gamarra and Sergio Álvarez finished third.

Cast

Couples
The participating couples of this season were conformed by the top four couples of the first and second season. During the first week, it was confirmed that Melissa Loza would not participate due to work problems, so she was replaced by the salsa singer Yahaira Plasencia. At the same time, Sergio Álvarez was replaced by George Neyra.

During the show, two professional partners (Irving Figueroa and Billy Gonzáles) could not continue in competition for different personal issues, being replaced by Pedro Ibáñez and Sergio Álvarez, respectively. Álvarez returned after not participating because of Loza's withdraw.

Previous seasons

Hosts and judges
Gisela Valcárcel, Aldo Díaz and Jaime "Choca" Mandros returned as hosts, while Morella Petrozzi, Carlos Cacho and Pachi Valle Riestra returned as judges. The VIP Jury was not introduced in this season. In Week 2, Alfredo Di Natale, professional dancer and director of the Arthur Murray dance studio, was announced as a new judge in the show.

Scoring charts

Red numbers indicate the sentenced for each week
Green numbers indicate the best steps for each week
 the couple was eliminated that week
 the couple was safe in the duel
 the winning couple
 the runner-up couple
 the third-place couple

Average score chart
This table only counts dances scored on a 40-point scale.

Highest and lowest scoring performances
The best and worst performances in each dance according to the judges' 40-point scale are as follows:

Couples' highest and lowest scoring dances
Scores are based upon a potential 40-point maximum.

Weekly scores
Individual judges' scores in the charts below (given in parentheses) are listed in this order from left to right: Morella Petrozzi, Carlos Cacho, Pachi Valle Riestra, Alfredo Di Natale.

Week 1: First Dances 
Individual judges' scores in the chart below (given in parentheses) are listed in this order from left to right: Morella Petrozzi, Carlos Cacho, Pachi Valle Riestra.

The couples danced the latin pop, merengue or salsa. This week, none couples were sentenced.
Running order

Week 2: Versus Night 
The couples were paired off into four sets, with each set of couples performing the same dance to different songs. In the little train, only the celebrities faced dancing reggaeton.
Running order

Week 3: Characterization Night 
The couples performed one unlearned dance being characterized to popular music icons. In the little train, only the celebrities faced dancing strip dance.

Due to work issues, Yahaira Plasencia could not be present on the set of the show, yet she decided to dance from where she worked, being evaluated by the judges through a video link. Because of this, she was not part of the little train.
Running order

Week 4: Trio Cha-cha-cha Night 
The couples (except those sentenced) danced trio cha-cha-cha involving another celebrity. In the little train, the celebrities faced with each other dancing reggaeton.

María Grazia & Sergio were going to dance with actor David Villanueva, but because Villanueva had suffered an injury, choreographer Arturo Chumbe performed in his place.
Running order

Week 5: Quarterfinals 
The couples performed a double dance and a team dance, in which only celebrities participated.
Running order

Week 6: Semifinals 
The couples danced jive and a dance improvisation which involved seven different dance styles, all being rehearsed during the week by the couples and only one being chosen by a draw in the live show. This week, none couples were sentenced.

During the dance improvisation round, Zumba physically assaulted Judge Carlos Cacho, for this reason his dance was not scored and the production decided to eliminate him, automatically saving to Maria Grazia & Sergio.
Running order

Week 7: Finals 
On the first part, the couples danced freestyle.

On the second part, the final three couples danced viennese waltz and cha-cha-cha or tango.
Running order

Running order (Part 2)

Dance chart
The celebrities and professional partners will dance one of these routines for each corresponding week:
 Week 1: Latin pop, merengue or salsa (First Dances)
 Week 2: One unlearned dance & the little train (Versus Night)
 Week 3: One unlearned dance & the little train (Characterization Night)
 Week 4: Trio cha-cha-cha & the little train (Trio Cha-cha-cha Night)
 Week 5: Double dance & team dance (Quarterfinals)
 Week 6: Jive & dance improvisation (Semifinal)
 Week 7: Freestyle, viennese waltz & cha-cha-cha or tango (Final)

 Highest scoring dance
 Lowest scoring dance
 Not scored or danced by the celebrity
 Gained bonus points for winning this dance
 Gained no bonus points for losing this dance
 Danced, but not scored
In Italic indicate the dances performed in the duel

Notes

References

External links 

El Gran Show
2015 Peruvian television seasons
Reality television articles with incorrect naming style